Moshier Reservoir is a reservoir located southeast of Moshier Falls, New York. Fish species present in the lake are rock bass, yellow perch, tiger muskie, white sucker, and black bullhead. There is state owned carry down trail access near the inlet.

References

Lakes of New York (state)
Lakes of Herkimer County, New York